The Movement for Democracy in Algeria was a political party in Algeria. It is moderately Islamist and boycotted the 2002 elections.

History and profile
The Movement for Democracy in Algeria was founded by Ahmed Ben Bella in 1982. However, the party was legalized in 1990. In 1995, the party was one of the signatories of the Sant'Egidio platform, an attempt of many major opposition parties to put an end to the Algerian Civil War, which was brokered by the Italian Catholic Community of Sant'Egidio.

References

1982 establishments in Algeria
Algerian democracy movements
Islamic political parties in Algeria
Political parties established in 1982
Political parties in Algeria